The 59th Venice Biennale is an international contemporary art exhibition held between April and November 2022. The Venice Biennale takes place biennially in Venice, Italy. Artistic director Cecilia Alemani curated its central exhibition.

Background 

The Venice Biennale is an international art biennial exhibition held in Venice, Italy. Often described as "the Olympics of the art world", participation in the Biennale is a prestigious event for contemporary artists. The festival has become a constellation of shows: a central exhibition curated by that year's artistic director, national pavilions hosted by individual nations, and independent exhibitions throughout Venice. The Biennale parent organization also hosts regular festivals in other arts: architecture, dance, film, music, and theater.

Outside of the central, international exhibition, individual nations produce their own shows, known as pavilions, as their national representation. Nations that own their pavilion buildings, such as the 30 housed on the Giardini, are responsible for their own upkeep and construction costs as well. Nations without dedicated buildings create pavilions in the Venice Arsenale and palazzos throughout the city.

The 59th Biennale will run from April 23, 2022, through November 27. Originally scheduled for the year prior, the COVID-19 pandemic postponed the 2020 architecture biennale into 2021 and the art biennale into 2022. As a result of the displacement, the art biennale will coincide with Documenta 15, another major contemporary art exhibition.

Central exhibition 

Cecilia Alemani, chief curator of High Line Art, will serve as the 59th Venice Biennale's artistic director. Her central exhibition is titled "The Milk of Dreams", after a book by the English-born Mexican surrealist artist Leonora Carrington filled with magical tales in which everything can be transformed through imagination. The exhibition follows three themes: body representation and metamorphosis, human relationships with technology, and the relationship between the body and Earth. Alemani developed the concept from conversations with artists and questions following the COVID-19 pandemic. Her curator's essay invokes feminist activist Silvia Federici and science fiction writer Ursula Le Guin.

"The Milk of Dreams" features 213 artists. Unlike prior shows, in which the majority of artists identified as male, instead less than 10 percent of Alemani's artists identified as male. Alemani underplayed this element and did not describe her show as overtly feminist, but has spoken about questioning the "universal ideal of the white, male 'Man of Reason' as the fixed center of the universe and measure of all things". Many of the central exhibition's artists are associated with the 20th century avant-garde. Nearly half of Alemani's artists are deceased, much higher in proportion than prior Biennales. These avant-garde artists are underrepresented, having been underrecognized in their time, and the Biennale services to highlight their work.

After the exhibition was postponed one year due to the coronavirus pandemic, Alemani hoped to use the extra year to prepare new projects and use the opening, which now precedes the Italian Liberation Day, to mark an occasion of togetherness. Alemani is the first Italian woman to serve as the Biennale's artistic director. She previously curated the 2017 Biennale's Italian pavilion. Her husband, Massimiliano Gioni, curated the 2013 Biennale.

National pavilions 

A total of 80 national pavilions participated in the 59th edition, with five countries participating for the first time: Cameroon, Namibia, Nepal, Oman and Uganda. Each country selected artists to represent their pavilion, ostensibly with an eye to the Biennale's theme.  As a sign of solidarity Ukraine and against war, Russian pavilion curator Raimundas Malašauskas withdrew his project and Russia's pavilion remained closed. In a statement,  Alexandra Sukhareva, one of the artists participating in Russia's Pavilion, posted in a statement on Instagram that “there is no place for art when civilians are dying under the fire of missiles, when citizens of Ukraine are hiding in shelters [and] when Russian protestors are getting silenced”.

Unlike prior biennales, in which there were clear frontrunners for the jury recognition of best national pavilion, such as Germany's Faust in 2017 or Lithuania's Sun & Sea in 2019, there was no such frontrunner in 2022.

Awards 

A jury presented the three main prizes:

 Golden Lion for best national participation: British pavilion (Sonia Boyce)
 Special recognition: French pavilion, Ugandan pavilion
 Golden Lion for best artist of the central exhibition: Simone Leigh
 Special recognition: Shuvinai Ashoona and Lynn Hershman Leeson
 Silver Lion for the most promising young artist of the exhibition: Ali Cherri

The 59th Biennale's Golden Lion for lifetime achievement went to Katharina Fritsch and Cecilia Vicuña.

Reception 

The 2022 Biennale was its most attended edition with over 800,000 tickets sold. While the 2022 Biennale had sold a third more tickets than the 2019 Biennale, it was also 14 percent longer, lasting 197 days.

Recounting the year's biggest moments, ArtNews said that two Black women winning the Beinnale's top awards was both a "legendary moment and a possible sign that the canonization of Black female artists was ... underway". The effects of the Russian invasion of Ukraine was another big moment, felt at the Biennale with the closure of the Russian pavilion and conspicuous absence of Russian oligarchs.

References

Further reading 

 
 

 Reviews

External links 

 

Venice Biennale exhibitions
2022 in art
2022 in Italy